The NCAA Division II Wrestling Championships for individuals and teams  were first officially sponsored in 1963 and have since been held annually. 

The NCAA Division II Wrestling Championships is a double-elimination tournament for individuals competing in ten weight classes. Sixteen wrestlers in each class qualify through four "Super Regional" tournaments.  During the championships, individual match winners earn points based on the level and quality of the victory, which are totaled to determine the team championship standings.

In addition to determining the national championship, the NCAA Division II Wrestling Championships also determine the Division II All-America team. The top eight finishers in each weight class qualify for Division II All-American status.

On March 13, 2020, the NCAA cancelled all of its 2020 wrestling championships due to the COVID-19 pandemic.

Team champions
Prior to 1963, only a single national championship was held for all members of the NCAA; Division II competition began in 1963, with Division III following in 1974. 
Names used are those current in the years listed.

Note: Shaded scores = Closest margin of victory,  point in 1979 & widest margin of victory, 88 points in 1982.

Team titles
List updated through the 2023 Championships

 A = Nebraska–Omaha brands itself as Omaha
 B = Western State (CO) is now Western Colorado
 C = Mankato State is now Minnesota State

Winning streaks
Source

Division II wrestlers to Division I championships
Sources 

Through 1989, the Division II finalists advanced to the Division I championships, held the following week, where many athletes earned All-American recognition in two divisions during the same season. This practice was discontinued after Carlton Haselrig of the Pittsburgh–Johnstown Mountain Cats won the Division II heavyweight title and advanced to Division I, where he also won the heavyweight title three years in a row, 1987–89.

Former Division II team champions now in Division I
Source

Notes

See also
NCAA Division I Wrestling Championships
NCAA Division III Wrestling Championships
NAIA national wrestling championship
Pre-NCAA Wrestling Champion
U Sports (Canada)
Intercollegiate women's wrestling champions

References

External links
NCAA Division II wrestling

NCAA Wrestling Championship
Championship
Wrestling
Recurring sporting events established in 1963
1963 establishments in Iowa